is a Japanese tokusatsu TV show which aired from 5 September 1997 until 28 August 1998. It is a direct sequel to the previous Ultraman series, Ultraman Tiga and the 13th entry to the Ultra Series.

Plot

In the year 2017 (seven years after the final episode of Ultraman Tiga), TPC has advanced beyond earth, and has created a new team, "Super GUTS". Humans have begun terraforming Mars and other planets in what is known as the "Age of the Neo Frontier". One day, the Neo Frontier is attacked by an alien race known as the Spheres. Shin Asuka has just joined Super GUTS and is in the middle of training maneuvers above Earth's atmosphere when he and his comrades are attacked. He proves himself in battle and can hold his own against ace pilot Ryo Yukimura. However, his ship is damaged and he ejects, after which he encounters a shining light. It is then that a new giant of light merges with the bewildered Shin, saving his life. When the Spheres enter Mars' atmosphere and merge with the Martian rocks to form monsters, Shin again participates in the battle, now equipped with a mysterious device known as the "Lieflasher". Upon the Sphere's new attack, Shin suddenly transforms into a colossal giant and manages to protect Mars from a group of monsters sent by the Spheres. The members of Super GUTS quickly catch on that this giant being is not Ultraman Tiga, but a new giant of light, "Ultraman Dyna".

The final story arc is rather somber, in contrast to the rest of the series. Dyna/Shin sacrifices themselves to save the Earth from Gransphia, the planet-sized mother form of the Spheres. He was last seen reuniting with his disappeared father and the two decided to continue traveling in-between dimensions. Eleven years after the end of the television series, the movie Mega Monster Battle: Ultra Galaxy establishes Shin's survival, and the Ultraman Saga had him briefly reunited with the rest of the Super GUTS before vanishing.

Episodes

Films
Ultraman Tiga & Ultraman Dyna: Warriors of the Star of Light (1998): Ultraman Dyna was one of the main Ultramen to appear in this movie (as events of the movie are set during times of the Dyna series). Ultraman Tiga also makes an important appearance.
Ultraman Tiga & Ultraman Dyna & Ultraman Gaia: Battle in Hyperspace (1999)
Ultraman Dyna: Return of Hanejiro (2001): An original video release that serves as a sequel to episode 47 of the series.
Mega Monster Battle: Ultra Galaxy (2009): Ultraman Dyna appears in this movie alongside the Showa-Era Ultramen, Ultraman Mebius, and the ZAP SPACY crew from Ultra Galaxy Mega Monster Battle. His storyline follows on directly from the finale of his series.
Ultraman Saga (2012): Ultraman Dyna is the main Ultraman in the movie (set after the events of Ultra Galaxy Legend and Dyna has travelled to another universe), joined Ultraman Zero and Ultraman Cosmos in this movie, and merges with Zero and Cosmos to become Ultraman Saga.

Other appearances
Superior Ultraman 8 Brothers (2008): Ultraman Dyna joined Ultraman Tiga, Ultraman Gaia and Ultraman Mebius in this movie, alongside Showa-era Ultra Heroes.
Ultraman Ginga S: Showdown! Ultra 10 Warriors!! (2015): Ultraman Dyna is one of the Heisei-era Ultra Heroes to fight along with other 9 Heisei-era Ultra Heroes.
Ultraman Orb: The Origin Saga (2016-2017): Ultraman Dyna joined Ultraman Orb, Ultraman Cosmos, Ultraman Gaia and Ultraman Agul.
Ultraman Decker (2022): Ultraman Dyna first appeared as a flashback and later joined Ultraman Decker.

Cast
: 
: 
: 
: 
: 
: 
: 
: 
: 
: 
: 
: 
: 
Narrator:

Guest cast

: 
: 
: 
: 
: 
: 
: 
: 
, : 
: 
: 
Helio Power Plant engineer (34): 
Director Hinoda (35, 36) : 
: 
: 
: 
: 
: 
: 
: 
: 
: 
: 
: 
:

Songs
Opening theme

Lyrics: 
Composition: 
Arrangement: 
Artist: 

Ending themes

Lyrics & Composition: 
Arrangement: 
Artist: 
Episodes: 1-26, 35, 50
"ULTRA HIGH" 
Lyrics, Composition, Arrangement, & Artist: Lazy
Episodes: 27–34, 37–49, 51
"Brave Love, TIGA (Instrumental Version)"
Composition: 
Arrangement: 
Episodes: 36

Insert & image themes

Lyrics: 
Composition & Arrangement: 
Artist:  (MoJo)
First used in episode 1.
"LOVE & PEACE"
Lyrics & Composition: Fumiaki Nakajima
Arrangement: Fumiaki Nakajima, 
Artist: Fumiaki Nakajima with Sara & Rei
Unused in the series.
"EVERYBODY WANTS LOVE"
Lyrics, Composition, Arrangement, & Artist: Lazy
Unused in the series.

Lyrics: Gorō Matsui
Composition: Kisaburō Suzuki
Arrangement: 
Artist: 
Episodes: 9

Lyrics: Gorō Matsui
Composition: Kisaburō Suzuki
Arrangement: Toshihiko Sahashi
Artist: 
Eepisodes: 24

Lyrics: Gorō Matsui
Composition: Kisaburō Suzuki
Arrangement: Tatsumi Yano
Artist: Tatsuya Maeda
Episodes: 35

Home media
In July 2020, Shout! Factory announced to have struck a multi-year deal with Alliance Entertainment and Mill Creek Entertainment, with the blessings of Tsuburaya and Indigo, that granted them the exclusive SVOD and AVOD digital rights to the Ultra series and films (1,100 TV episodes and 20 films) acquired by Mill Creek the previous year. Ultraman Dyna, amongst other titles, will stream in the United States and Canada through Shout! Factory TV and Tokushoutsu.

Notes

References

External links
Tsuburaya Productions - The Official Home of Ultraman (Japanese)
Japan Hero - webpage devoted to Japanese superheroes

1997 Japanese television series debuts
1998 Japanese television series endings
Ultra television series
Mainichi Broadcasting System original programming